The 2011 FA Community Shield (also known as The FA Community Shield sponsored by McDonald's for sponsorship reasons) was the 89th FA Community Shield, an annual football match contested by the winners of the previous season's Premier League and FA Cup competitions. The match was the 160th Manchester derby between Manchester United and Manchester City and played at Wembley Stadium, London, on 7 August 2011. Manchester United won the game 3–2, with goals from Chris Smalling and Nani (2), after Joleon Lescott and Edin Džeko had put City 2–0 up at half-time.

Manchester United qualified to take part for the fifth consecutive year by winning the 2010–11 Premier League title and Manchester City qualified by winning the 2010–11 FA Cup. United successfully defended the shield to win it for the fourth time in five years, having beaten Chelsea 3–1 in the 2010 match.

Background

This was only the second occasion the two teams had met in the competition, with the first being the 1956 FA Charity Shield, which United won 1–0. Both teams secured their place in the 2011 Community Shield on the same day, 14 May 2011, when United clinched the 2010–11 Premier League title with a 1–1 draw against Blackburn Rovers at Ewood Park and City beating Stoke City 1–0 a few hours later in the 2011 FA Cup Final.

Match details

Statistics

Source: BBC Sport

See also
2010–11 Premier League
2010–11 FA Cup
Manchester derby
1956 FA Charity Shield – the only previous occasion the Charity or Community Shield has been contested by the two Manchester clubs

References

2011
2011–12 in English football
2011 sports events in London
Charity Shield 2011
Charity Shield 2011
Events at Wembley Stadium
August 2011 sports events in the United Kingdom